The 2006 Copa Colsanitas Seguros Bolivar was a women's tennis tournament played on outdoor clay courts at the Club Campestre El Rancho in Bogotá, Colombia that was part of Tier III of the 2006 WTA Tour. It was the ninth edition of the tournament and ran from 20 February through 26 February 2006. Sixth-seeded Lourdes Domínguez Lino won the singles title and earned $28,000 first-prize money.

Finals

Singles

 Lourdes Domínguez Lino defeated  Flavia Pennetta 7–6(7–3), 6–4
 It was Domínguez Lino's first singles title of her career.

Doubles

 Gisela Dulko /  Flavia Pennetta defeated  Ágnes Szávay /  Jasmin Wöhr 7–6(7–1), 6–1

References

External links
 Official website 
 Official website 
 ITF tournament edition details
 Tournament draws

Copa Colsanitas
Copa Colsanitas
2006 in Colombian tennis